Sant Feliu de Llobregat Cathedral or the Cathedral of Saint Lawrence is a Roman Catholic cathedral in Sant Feliu de Llobregat, Catalonia, Spain. It is the seat of the Diocese of Sant Feliu de Llobregat.

See also
Catholic Church in Spain

References

Roman Catholic cathedrals in Catalonia